The Morgan A. and Clarissa R. Knapp House, at 106 South 100 East in Richmond, Utah, was listed on the National Register of Historic Places in 2004.

It is a one-and-a-half-story Craftsman-style bungalow built in 1913–14.  It has a full-width porch.  Its yellow brick walls are laid in running bond.  It has "rare colored and leaded-glass Arts & Crafts-style windows", the larger ones featuring upper sashes with Queen Anne-style colored lights.

References

American Craftsman architecture in Utah
National Register of Historic Places in Cache County, Utah